Babhangawan is a village in Lakhisarai district, Bihar, India.

Babhanganwan village is located in Lakhisarai Tehsil of Lakhisarai district in Bihar, India. It is situated 13 km away from Lakhisarai, which serves as both a district and sub-district headquarters of Babhangawan village. Amhara is the gram panchayat of Babhangawan village. It is one of the largest and most prominent villages in Amhara Panchayat of Lakhisarai Block as well as district. Its nearest railway station is Mankatha. Babhangawan is also accessible via National Highway 80. This village is situated on the bank of Harohar River in north and has a famous Nag Temple, Shree Shesh Nag temple in the west. A temple dedicated to Lord Durga and Maharani mata is also situated here. The famous Nagpanchmi (celebrated in Savan month as per hindi month calendar) is very much popular in the state.

The village has a population of around 3,737 people with their main occupation in agriculture. Babhanganwan village has higher literacy rate compared to Bihar.

The total geographical area of village is 1,465 hectares.

Around 8848 acres of agricultural land are used by villagers to produces grains, specially pulses and wheat.  The village is divided in different "tolas" (Small Blocks) like Jaji tola, Paschim tola, Dobha par etc. People of the village are very laborious.

Climate 
The climate of the village is somewhat extreme in nature, i.e. quite hot during the summer and fairly cold during the winter. January is the coldest month, when the mean minimum temperature comes down to approximately 4 °C. The temperature starts rising from March and reaches its peak in May when the mercury touches about 45 °C. Rain starts in mid June and lasts till mid September. The district gets easterly winds from June to September, and from October to May wind direction reverses. Maximum rains occur during the months of July and August (289 mm).

Education 
In Babhangawan there are public schools. Village families send their children to government schools.
 M.S Babhangawan is a Primary with Upper Primary School in Bhangawan Village of Lakhisarai. It was established in the year 1949 and the school management is Department of Education. It's a Hindi Medium - Co-educational school. M.S Babhangawan runs in a government school building. The school has total 9 classrooms. The lowest Class is 1 and the highest class in the school is 8. This school has 4 Male Teachers and 3 Female Teachers. There is a library facility available in this school and the total number of books in the library is about 200. This school also has a playground. M.S Babhangawan does not provide any residential facility. The school also provides meal facility and meal is prepared in school.
 S.S.N.High School Babhangawan

Babhanganwan Population 
As per census 2011 Babhanganwan village has population of 3,737, of which 1961 are males while 1,776 are females. In Babhanganwan village population of children with age 0-6 is 677 which makes up 18.12% of total population of village. Average Sex Ratio of Babhanganwan village is 906 which is lower than Bihar state average of 918. Child Sex Ratio for the Babhanganwan as per census is 945, higher than Bihar average of 935.

Babhanganwan village has higher literacy rate compared to Bihar. In 2011, literacy rate of Babhanganwan village was 70.46% compared to 61.80% of Bihar. In Babhanganwan Male literacy stands at 77.00% while female literacy rate was 63.17%.

As per constitution of India and Panchyati Raaj Act, Babhanganwan village is administrated by Mukhiya of Amhara Panchayat (Head of Village) who is elected representative of village.

Occupation 
In Babhanganwan village out of total population, 1,559 were engaged in work activities. 76.14% of workers describe their work as Main Work (Employment or earning more than 6 months) while 23.86% were involved in Marginal activity providing livelihood for less than 6 months. Of 1,559 workers engaged in Main Work, 577 were cultivators (owner or co-owner) while 555 were agricultural labourers.

Shree Shesh Nag Temple 
Shree Shesh Nag Temple is a very famous temple and it is situated at the Bank of Haruhar River in the north & in the west from Babhangama village. Every day in the morning & evening worship is organized by peoples of this village with Vedic Mantra & other slokas. In this temple Every Year on the occasion of Nag Panchami day a special event & worship is organized by peoples of this village. From Every house prasad of Milk & Fruits, etc are collected at the temple and pray to Nag Baba for about 1 to 2 hours for Prosperous & peaceful life for the peoples of this village as well as others and during this period the Nag & Nagin Devtas comes and drinks the Milk which gets offered to them. On this occasion, a big fair(Mela)is gathered to see this festival from this village & neighboring villages. On May 7, 2019 A kalasha, also spelled kalash or kalasa , Vase (Sanskrit: कलश) was added to the top of the main temple.

Bank 
Village has a PNB Bank (Punjab National Bank, IFSC Code: PUNB0302200) for day to day financial operations.

References

Villages in Lakhisarai district